is a Japanese former ski jumper. At the 1972 Olympics in Sapporo he became the first Japanese athlete to win a gold medal and the second Japanese (after Chiharu Igaya) to win any medal at the Winter Olympics. Previously he placed second at the 1970 World Championships and won the first three jumping events at the 1971/72 Four Hills Tournament. He also took part in the 1964, 1968 and 1976 Olympics and served as the Olympics flag bearer for Japan in 1976 and 1998.

Kasaya took up ski jumping at the Taketsuru facility in his native Yoichi, which was built by the founder of Nikka Whisky Distilling Masataka Taketsuru. The facility was renamed after Kasaya in 1972. Kasaya was a long-term employee of the Nikka distillery, eventually becoming its section head.

References

External links

 

1943 births
Living people
Japanese male ski jumpers
Ski jumpers at the 1964 Winter Olympics
Ski jumpers at the 1968 Winter Olympics
Ski jumpers at the 1972 Winter Olympics
Ski jumpers at the 1976 Winter Olympics
Olympic gold medalists for Japan
Sportspeople from Hokkaido
People from Yoichi, Hokkaido
Olympic ski jumpers of Japan
Olympic medalists in ski jumping
FIS Nordic World Ski Championships medalists in ski jumping
Recipients of the Medal with Purple Ribbon
Medalists at the 1972 Winter Olympics
Persons of Cultural Merit